Turushka (or Turuṣka) may refer to:

 a Sanskrit word for olibanum
 a term often used for Turks in some ancient sources; see 
 Turushka dynasty, a ruling dynasty of ancient South Asia

See also
 Turushkaf, a village in Arabkhaneh Rural District, South Khorasan Province, Iran